Acacus is a genus of phasmids belonging to the tribe Necrosciini.

The species of this genus are found in Southeastern Asia.

Species:

Acacus braggi 
Acacus rufipectus 
Acacus sapuani 
Acacus sarawacus

References

Lonchodidae
Phasmatodea genera
Phasmatodea of Asia